Bryan Jeffrey Wagner (born March 28, 1962  in Escondido, California) is a former American football punter in the National Football League for the  Chicago Bears, Cleveland Browns, New England Patriots, Green Bay Packers, and San Diego Chargers. He played college football at California State University, Northridge.

Early years
Wagner attended Hilltop High School. He began his collegiate career at California Lutheran University. He later transferred to California State University, Northridge, where he was the starter at quarterback and punter.

Professional career
After the 1985 NFL Draft, Wagner was signed as an undrafted free agent by the Dallas Cowboys. He was also selected by the Baltimore Stars in the 15th round (216th overall) of the 1985 USFL Draft. He was waived by the Cowboys on August 27.

In May 1986, he signed with the New York Giants. He was released on August 11. On August 20, 1986, he signed with the St. Louis Cardinals. He was released before the start of the season, on August 26.

In 1987, he was signed as a free agent by the Denver Broncos. On August 25, he was traded to the Chicago Bears in exchange for guard Stefan Humphries. He replaced the Bears' punter Maury Buford, until Tommy Barnhardt took the role from Wagner later in the season. On October 30, 1988, he had a 70-yard punt against the New England Patriots. He played in the historic Fog Bowl against the Philadelphia Eagles.

In 1990, he set a Cleveland Browns record with four punts blocked in a single season, including 2 in one game against the Kansas City Chiefs. He averaged 38.9 yards per punt with a net average of 30.9 yards.

In 1991, he played in 3 games with the New England Patriots, until being released after a punt from his end zone hit teammate Eugene Lockhart's back and was recovered for a touchdown by the Pittsburgh Steelers' Ernie Mills.

In 1992, he signed with the Green Bay Packers and was released on August 24. On November 9, he was re-signed by the Packers.

On May 6, 1994, he re-signed with the Packers but was released before the start of the season, on August 21. In 1994, he signed with the San Diego Chargers. He set a Super Bowl record by averaging 48.8 yards per punt. He chose not to re-sign with the Chargers for the 1995 season and Australian rules football player Darren Bennett took over the punting job.

In 1995, he signed with the New York Jets and was released on August 21, after not being able to pass Brian Hansen on the depth chart. In November, he signed with the New England Patriots, taking over after Pat O'Neill was released. He was not re-signed after the season.

In 1996, he signed with the Detroit Lions and was released on July 3 to make room for punter Rich Camarillo.

Personal life

Wagner married Cleveland TV news anchor and personality Robin Swoboda in 1991; they divorced in 2015. Wagner taught physical education and coached sports (football and basketball) at Willetts Middle School in Brunswick, Ohio.

On April 27, 2005, he was hired as the football head coach at Chippewa High School and announced his resignation on November 20, 2006. In 2017, he was hired as the football head coach at Sweetwater High School in National City, California. In 2020, he was hired as the head football coach at Hilltop High School in Chula Vista, California.

References

1962 births
Living people
Sportspeople from Escondido, California
Players of American football from California
American football punters
Cal State Northridge Matadors football players
Cal Lutheran Kingsmen football players
Chicago Bears players
Cleveland Browns players
New England Patriots players
Green Bay Packers players
San Diego Chargers players
High school football coaches in Ohio
High school football coaches in California